Daniela Carlos de Araújo (born July 2, 1975 in Rio de Janeiro, Brazil) is a Brazilian singer, composer, musician and actress.

Career

Discography

Soundtracks

Singles

Television
 2009 – A Fazenda .... Herself
 2006 – Cidadão Brasileiro .... Renée Girard
 2005 – Quem Vai Ficar com Mário? .... Karla Frida
 2005 – Carga Pesada
 2003 – Agora É Que São Elas .... Neném

Filmography
 2009 – A Mulher Invisível ... Bárbara
 2009 – Quanto Dura o Amor ... Justine

Awards
Latin Grammy Awards of 2008
2008: Best Contemporary Brazilian Album- "Música Nova"
2008: Best Brazilian Song – "Coisas Que Eu Sei" (de Dudu Falcão)

References

External links
Official Page

1975 births
Brazilian singer-songwriters
Living people
Musicians from Rio de Janeiro (city)
The Farm (TV series) contestants
21st-century Brazilian singers
21st-century Brazilian women singers
Brazilian women singer-songwriters